Sandy Creek may refer to:

Communities

Australia
 Sandy Creek, South Australia, a town
 Sandy Creek, Queensland a town
 Sandy Creek, Victoria, a locality in the Shire of Indigo

United States
 Sandy Creek, New York, a town in Oswego County
 Sandy Creek (village), New York, in the above town
 Sandy Creek, North Carolina, a town in Brunswick County

Streams

Australia
 Sandy Creek (Arnhem Land)
 Sandy Creek (Queensland), a tributary of Lake Somerset
 Sandy Creek (Central West, New South Wales), a tributary of the Bogan River
 Sandy Creek (Mirrool), an indefinite creek in the Riverina region
 Sandy Creek (Richmond Valley)
 Sandy Creek (South Australia), a tributary of the Pirie-Torrens corridor
 Sandy Creek (South Coast, New South Wales), a tributary of the Bega River
 Sandy Creek (Upper Hunter, New South Wales), a tributary of the Gloucester River
 Sandy Creek (Victoria), multiple streams in Victoria

United States
 Sandy Creek (Choctawhatchee River), a creek in northeastern Leon County, Florida
 Sandy Creek (Georgia), a creek in northeastern Jackson County, Georgia
 Sandy Creek (Michigan), a tributary of Lake Erie
 Sandy Creek (Apple Creek), a stream in Missouri
 Sandy Creek (Cuivre River), a stream in Missouri
 Sandy Creek (Joachim Creek), a stream in Missouri
Sandy Creek (New York), in Oswego County, New York
 Sandy Creek (Deep River tributary), a stream in Guilford and Randolph Counties, North Carolina
 Sandy Creek (Middle Fork Coquille River), in Oregon
 Sandy Creek (Ohio), a tributary of the Tuscarawas River
 Sandy Creek (Allegheny River), in northwestern Pennsylvania
 Sandy Creek (Banister River tributary), a stream in Halifax County, Virginia
 Sandy Creek (Ohio River), a tributary of the Ohio River in West Virginia
 Sandy Creek (Texas), a grus creek near Enchanted Rock

Other uses
 Sandy Creek (horse), a Thoroughbred racehorse
 Sandy Creek station, a light rail station in Pittsburgh, Pennsylvania, United States

See also
Big Sandy Creek (disambiguation)
Sandy (disambiguation)